Wincenty Danilewicz (1787 – 23 March 1878) - Chevau-léger in the Napoleonic campaign, secretary of Chancellery of Senat in Congress Poland, chief archivist of heraldric administration of Congress Poland in Warsaw.

Biography 
Wincenty Danilewicz, born 1787 in Minsk (Polish–Lithuanian Commonwealth) – died 23 March 1878 in Jędrzejów (Russian Empire)- was a member of the Ostoja Danielewicz family and served as a Chevau-léger in the Napoleonic campaign, for which he was awarded the French Order of Legion of Honour and Saint Helena Medal. He took part (among others) in The Battle of Arcis-sur-Aube (20–21 March 1814), where he was wounded.

In 1815 he returned home, and started to work as a secretary of Chancellery of Senat in Congress Poland. Then he worked in the archive of heraldry administration of Congress Poland in Warsaw. He retired in 1844.

Later in his life, Wincenty Danilewicz moved to Jędrzejów.  Afterwards he ran the literary production i.e.: three tragedies and the opera buffa. His great-grandson Maciej Masłowski wrote (1957), that in Wincenty testament (1859) thirty volumes of his memoirs were also mentioned.

Wincenty was married to Franciszka (born Grunwald, ca 1797/1798, died 4 January 1842) and they had a daughter, Waleria Józefa Katarzyna (1827-1869) who married Rajmund Masłowski (lawyer). Together, they had a son Stanisław Masłowski, outstanding Polish painter. Masłowski family belonged to Clan Samson that used Samson Coat of Arms. He died 23 March 1878 (aged 90)

Gallery

See also
 Ostoja Danielewicz
 Clan of Ostoja
 Ostoja coat of arms

References

Bibliography 

 (in Polish) Bielecki R.: Szwoleżerowie gwardii, seria: „Słynne Pułki Polskie” (series: "Famous Polish Regiments", Ed. „Neriton” Publishers, Warszawa 1996;
 (Polish) Łoza S.: Legia honorowa w Polsce 1803–1923 (French Order of Legion of Honour in Poland 1803–1923), Zamość 1923, ed. Zygmunt Pomarański i Spółka (reprint Warszawa 1986, ed. Wydawnictwa Artystyczne i Filmowe – WAiF;
 (Polish) Masłowski M. [coll.]: Stanisław Masłowski – Materiały do życiorysu i twórczości (Stanisław Masłowski – Materials for the biography and works), Wrocław 1957, ed. "Ossolineum" – Polish Academy of Sciences.

External links
 History of Danilewicz vel Danielewicz family on the page of Ostoja Clan Association

People of the Napoleonic Wars
Polish nobility
Clan of Ostoja
People from Minsk
1787 births
1878 deaths